From the Mint Factory is the second studio album by American R&B band Mint Condition.  The album was released on October 5, 1993, on Jimmy Jam & Terry Lewis' record label Perspective Records. The album peaked and charted at number 104 on the Billboard 200 and number 18 on the Top R&B Albums chart.

Track listing
Credits adapted from liner notes and Allmusic.

Personnel
Credits adapted from liner notes, Discogs and Allmusic.
 Stokley Williams - drum programming, drums, keyboards, djembe drum, bass synth, steel pan, percussion, B-3 organ, clavinet, lead vocals, background vocals
 Keri Lewis - keyboards, drum programming, bass synth, background vocals
 Lawrence Waddell - piano, keyboards, B-3 Organ, background vocals
 Homer O'Dell - guitar, keyboards, drum programming, background vocals
 Ricky Kinchen - bass, background vocals
 Jeffrey Allen -saxophone, keyboards, fender rhodes, background vocals

Additional personnel
 Jellybean Johnson - guitar solo
 Chris "Daddy" Dave - drums
 Foley - guitar solo
 James "Popeye" Greer - background vocals
 Lisa Dixon - background vocals
 Chris "Daddy" Dave - background vocals
 Alice Paguyo - background vocals
 Heidi Valera - background vocals
 Cajun Joe - background vocals
 Mint Condition - record engineering
 Bradley Yost - record engineering
 Jeff Taylor - record engineering
 Steve Hodge - record engineering
 Steve Hodge - mixing
 Dave Rideau - mixing
 Brian Gardner - mastering
 Jimmy Jam & Terry Lewis - executive production
 Jeff Katz - photography
 Rowan Moore - art direction and design

Charts

Weekly charts

Year-end charts

References

1993 albums
Mint Condition (band) albums
Perspective Records albums